The Governor of the Bank of Italy is the most senior position in the Bank of Italy. It is nominally a civil service post, but the appointment tends to be from within the bank, with the incumbent grooming his or her successor.

List of governors

References

Bank of Italy
Italy